This is a list of notable people that have been diagnosed with tinnitus.
  
 Ryan Adams
 Richard Attenborough
 Igor Balis
 Thomas Bangalter
 Jeff Beck
 Ludwig van Beethoven
 Peter Brown
 Dolly Buster 
 Bilinda Butcher
 Gerard Butler
 Louis-Ferdinand Céline
 Eric Clapton
 Ben Cohen
 Phil Collins
 Charles Darwin (see Charles Darwin's health)
 Bob Dylan
 Dave Grohl
 John Densmore
 Al Di Meola
 Danny Elfman
 John Entwistle
 Till Fellner
 Kirsty Gallacher
 Liam Gallagher
 Noel Gallagher
 Boy George
 Paul Gilbert
 Gary Glitter
 Vincent van Gogh
 Jeff Gordon
 Francisco de Goya
 Charlie Haden
 Ayumi Hamasaki
 Kirk Hammett
 Sam Harris
 James Hetfield
 Howard Hughes
 Mike Joyce
 Joey Jordison
 Garrison Keillor
 DeForest Kelley
 Martin Kemp
 Myles Kennedy
 Anthony Kiedis
 Steve Kilbey
 David Letterman
 Huey Lewis
 Rush Limbaugh
 Arjen Anthony Lucassen
 Steve Lukather
 Martin Luther
 Paddy McAloon
 Josh Malina
 Chris Martin
 Steve Martin
 Joseph Mawle
 Martin McGuinness
 Seán McLoughlin
 Stephin Merritt
 Michelangelo
 Roger Miller
 Liza Minnelli
 Moby
 Derek Mooney
 Leonard Nimoy
 Ozzy Osbourne
 Andy Partridge
 Tim Powles
 Ian Punnett
 Tony Randall
 Ronald Reagan
 Keanu Reeves
 Susanna Reid
 Trent Reznor
 Peter Robinson
 Mick Ronson
 Francis Rossi
 Jimmy Savile
 Joe Scarborough
 Neal Schon
 Robert Schumann
 Peter Silberman
 William Shatner
 Alan Shepard
 Kevin Shields
 Bedřich Smetana
 Sylvester Stallone
 Vivian Stanshall
 Sting
 Jack Straw
 Barbra Streisand
 Tom Tancredo
 Roger Taylor
 Pete Townshend
 KT Tunstall
 Lars Ulrich
 Ville Valo
 Jo Whiley
 will.i.am
 Thom Yorke
 Neil Young
 Demi Lovato

References

Lists of people by medical condition